Jinan Metro Line 3 is a rapid transit line in Jinan, China. The line use six-car Type B rolling stock. It is completely underground.

It was opened on 28 December 2019.

Timeline

Stations

Notes

References

03
2019 establishments in China
Railway lines opened in 2019